Kupe orthonairovirus, also called Kupe virus, is a species of virus in the genus Orthonairovirus.

History

The virus was isolated from pooled ticks (Amblyomma gemma and Rhipicephalus pulchellus) collected from cattle hides in Nairobi, Kenya, in October 1999. The word 'Kupe' is Kiswahili for tick.

Genome

The genome is composed a single strand of negative sense RNA in three parts - small (S), medium (M0 and large(L).

The L segment RNA is 12,330 nucleotides (nt) in length and encodes one open reading frame (ORF) of 4,050 amino acids. There is a non coding regions: the  5′ region of 40 nt and the 3′ region of 137 nt. This open reading frame encodes several modules including a RNA-dependent RNA polymerase. It is probably post translationally cleaved into several proteins but this has yet to be shown.

The M segment RNA is 4,818 nucleotides in length and contains one open reading frame flanked by 5′ and 3′ non coding regions of 47 and 121 nucleotides respectively. The ORF encodes a protein of 1549 amino acids with 8 potential sites for N-linked glycosylation. It contains a unique potential N-gly site in the Gn and Gc glycoprotein regions at amino acids 612 and 1514 respectively.

The S segment has 1,694 nt and encodes an ORF of 483 amino acids. The 5′ and 3′ noncoding regions are 49 nt and 193 nt in length respectively.

References

Nairoviridae